is a railway station in the city of Okazaki, Aichi, Japan, operated by Meitetsu.

Lines
Yahagibashi Station is served by the Meitetsu Nagoya Main Line and is 32.5 kilometers from the terminus of the line at Toyohashi Station.

Station layout
The station has two island platforms connected by a footbridge, serving three tracks. Platform 4 is a shunt platform with no thru-traffic. The station has automated ticket machines, Manaca automated turnstiles and is staffed.

Platforms

Adjacent stations

Station history
Yahagibashi Station was opened on 1 June 1923 as a station on the privately held Aichi Electric Railway. The Aichi Electric Railway was acquired by the Meitetsu Group on 1 August 1935.

Passenger statistics
In fiscal 2017, the station was used by an average of 6,609 passengers daily.

Surrounding area
 Toray Okazaki plant
 Aichi Gakusen University
Okazaki Josei High School

See also
 List of Railway Stations in Japan

References

External links

 Official web page 

Railway stations in Japan opened in 1923
Railway stations in Aichi Prefecture
Stations of Nagoya Railroad
Okazaki, Aichi